Ayça Aykaç (born 27 February 1996) is a Turkish volleyball player. She plays in the libero position. Currently, she plays for Vakıfbank Istanbul. She is a member of the Turkey women's national volleyball team.

Personal life

Aykaç was born in İzmir.

Playing career

Honours

Club 
 Champions  (6) 
 2016–17 Turkish Women's Volleyball League (VakıfBank)
 2017 FIVB Volleyball Women's Club World Championship (VakıfBank)
 2017–18 Turkish Women's Volleyball League (VakıfBank)
 2021 FIVB Club World Championship  (VakıfBank)
 2021–22 Turkish Women's Volleyball League (VakıfBank)
 2021–22 CEV Women's Champions League  (VakıfBank)

 Third places  (1)
 2016 FIVB Volleyball Women's Club World Championship (VakıfBank)

National team

 2021 Nations League -  Bronze Medal
 2021 European Championship -  Bronze Medal

Individual 

2021–22 CEV Women's Champions League - Best Libero

External links
Volleyball World Profile

References 

Living people
1996 births
Sportspeople from İzmir
Turkish women's volleyball players
VakıfBank S.K. volleyballers
Liberos